Amir Akiva Segal (born in 1980 in Tzippori) is a poet, literary critic, employment consultant and the CEO of Ovdim.

Biography
Segal holds a BA in psychology and philosophy from the Hebrew University, and a master's degree in organizational development from the College of Management.

Amir Segal is married to Anya Zhuravel Segal, and lives in Jerusalem.

Literary activity
His poems have been published in several journals, "Iton 77", "Maayan", "Mita'am" Shvo and others

Produced and presented the radio program "Shirat Mecha'a" at "All for Peace" radio station, dealing with Israeli protest songs and poetry.

Served as editor and host of series of evenings "Song of Pain" that dealt with protest songs at Beit Avi Chai in Jerusalem.

Since 2010, serves as a literature critic at Israel Broadcasting Authority.

Since 2013, publishes a weekly poetry review column in the weekly Kav LaMoshav. Segal was named "the most important poetry critic in Israel today" by Ilan Berkovich.

Political activity
During his undergraduate studies Amir Segal chaired the Israeli Labor Party students organization at the Hebrew University in Jerusalem.

Segal served as a member of the Board of the Association for Civil Rights in Israel.

Segal was deputy chairman of the junior faculty staff union at Ben-Gurion University in Beersheba.

In June 2021 Segal was elected as a member of Association for the Social Scientific Study of Jewry Board – as the doctoral students representative.

Books
"On My Return From the Reserves", Gvanim, 2008, poetry

"West of Here", on the site of Beit Avi Chai, 2013, serialized novel

The Other Land, Iton 77 Publishers, 2014, poetry

Awards
Awarded the Rafi Farbman Young Poets Award in 2011.

Recipient of the Harry Hershon literature award from the Hebrew University of Jerusalem in 2014.

Recipient of the Rachel Negev Poetry award from the Hebrew University of Jerusalem in 2020.

Recipient of the Association for the Social Scientific Study of Jewry research grant for 2020.

Recipient of the Foundation for the Advancement of Israeli Creators and Creativity grant of ACUM for book publication for 2021

Recipient of the Annenberg Foundation scholarship for American Studies in the Hebrew University of Jerusalem for 2022

References

Israeli poets
Hebrew-language poets
Hebrew University of Jerusalem alumni
Living people
Israeli literary critics
1980 births
Israeli chief executives
People from Northern District (Israel)